The Adventist College of Nursing and Health Sciences, abbreviated as ACNHS, is a private nursing school in Penang, Malaysia and offers nurse training programs at the undergraduate level. It was established by and closely associated with Penang Adventist Hospital and forms part of a network of Seventh-day Adventist owned institutions of higher education. The college is accredited by the Malaysian Qualifications Agency to offer the Diploma in Nursing and Assistant Nurse certificate.

The college operates from its campus at 488B-07-01/02, Midlands One-stop (Level 7), Burmah Road, 10350 Pulau Tikus, George Town, Penang, Malaysia, close to Penang Adventist Hospital.

History
From the 1960s till 1980, Penang Adventist Hospital had been sending students to The School of Nursing of the Bangkok Adventist Hospital, Thailand. In the mid 1980s, the government of Thailand disallowed foreign students from sitting for the national certificate and registration examination, so Penang Adventist Hospital stopped sending students to Thailand and sought an alternative.

ACNHS received approval to operate from governmental authorities in October 1992 as Adventist College of Nursing. The school's first offering was a three-year Diploma Nursing program in September 1993. In September 1994, offered the 15-month conversion program to convert the existing nursing aides to assistant nurses. A total of 3 batches of assistant nurses were trained. Thereafter the conversion program was stopped and replaced by the 24-month Assistant Nurse Certificate Course which started in January 1998.

The college was renamed the Adventist College of Nursing and Health Sciences (ACNHS) as of January 1, 2011.

References

External links
 

Colleges in Malaysia
Universities and colleges affiliated with the Seventh-day Adventist Church
Nursing schools in Malaysia